Slovene book fair and festival is a traditional Slovenian trade fair and festival for the books that have been written in Slovene and published in the previous year.

It is held each year at the Cankar Centre and organised by the Association of Book Publishers in Slovenia. The participating publishing houses are mainly from Slovenia, however, some of them are serving the Slovene minorities in Italy, Austria, and elsewhere.

It includes presentations of new books, exhibitions, a training programme, debates, presentations for schools, and shows for children. It is the largest fair of its kind in Slovenia, each year attracting around 100 publishing houses and thousands of visitors. At the event the association also bestows the Best First Book Award, the Best Book Design Award and the Schwentner Award for outstanding publishing achievements. The Publishing Academy features discussion and debate on current issues affecting the books and publishing sector.

References

External links
Official website

Publishing in Slovenia
Festivals in Slovenia
Economy of Slovenia
Book fairs in Europe